Classical Music is a trade magazine for the classical music industry. It co-sponsors the annual ABO/Rhinegold Awards for backstage work in music, held for the first time in January 2012 - and has a network of correspondents worldwide. 

Its website includes news on the classical music industry. The magazine published an account of the interruption by protesters of the Jerusalem Quartet's concert at London's Wigmore Hall on 29 March 2010.
It was published by Rhinegold Publishing, and is now published by the Mark Allen Group. 

Previous editions have been co-edited by industry experts, including Deborah Annetts (Incorporated Society of Musicians), Julian Lloyd-Webber and Bob Chilcott.

Content

Each issue consists of the following broad plan:

Contents and Editorial: What features in the current issue, with a brief welcoming passage written by the guest-editor
News: The magazine includes at least four pages of news every month
Barlines: Usually four pages of shorter news stories and listings in the following categories: musical chairs (tracking changes in personnel throughout the industry), announcements, awards, opportunities, events, and obituaries
Q&A: Topical five-minute interview
Premieres: Two pages, comprising listings of premiere performances for the month and a ‘Premiere Choice’ composer interview. Full listings where space is not available feature on the magazine's website
Features
Meet the Maestro: A two-page conductor interview
Book reviews
Recording: Double-page-spread of news and reviews on the latest releases, by regular records correspondent Phillip Sommerich
Broadcasting: In-depth feature and guide to what to listen out for in the following weeks, by broadcasting correspondent Richard Fawkes
Next issue guide
Letters
Hornblower’s diary

History 

Classical Music started out as Classical Music Weekly, launched under editor Trevor Richardson in 1976. In a retrospective for the 500th issue, he wrote, "CMW was printed on the same presses as Private Eye at the Socialist Workers Press in Bethnal Green ... We worked hard, laughed a lot and panicked frequently."
After nine months, Rhinegold Publishing took over the title, changing the frequency to fortnightly. After a further nine months, as Classical Music & Album Review, in 1979 it was given the title Classical Music.
The second editor of the magazine, Robert Maycock, held the position from September 1977 to June 1986. He was succeeded by Graeme Kay, who was in turn succeeded by Keith Clarke in 1991 followed by Kimon Daltas who took over in 2013. In 2017 Ashutosh Khandekar and Owen Mortimer took over the title as managing editors.

Past members of the magazine’s editorial team include The Times’ chief music critic Richard Morrison, BBC Radio 3 presenter Graeme Kay, opera producer Mike Ashman and Fleet Street arts correspondent Dalya Alberge.

References

External links
 Classical Music Magazine website

Classical music magazines
Magazines established in 1976
Magazines published in London
Monthly magazines published in the United Kingdom
Music magazines published in the United Kingdom